Romblon's at-large congressional district refers to the lone congressional district of the Philippines in the province of Romblon. It has been represented in the House of Representatives of the Philippines since 1919 and earlier in the Malolos Congress (National Assembly) of the First Philippine Republic from 1898 to 1901. Romblon has been represented by a single representative elected provincewide at-large since its reestablishment as a regular province separate from Capiz in 1917. From 1943 to 1944, the district was again dissolved and reconsolidated with Capiz for the National Assembly of the Second Philippine Republic. Between 1978 and 1984, regional delegations were formed in lieu of provinces for the national parliament of the Fourth Philippine Republic, with Romblon forming part of the twenty-seat Region IV-A's at-large district. It was restored as a single-member district in 1984.

The district is currently represented in the 18th Congress by Eleandro Jesus F. Madrona of the Nacionalista Party (NP).

Representation history

Election results

2016

2013

2010

See also
Legislative districts of Romblon

References

Congressional districts of the Philippines
Politics of Romblon
1898 establishments in the Philippines
1917 establishments in the Philippines
At-large congressional districts of the Philippines
Congressional districts of Mimaropa
Constituencies established in 1898
Constituencies disestablished in 1901
Constituencies established in 1917
Constituencies disestablished in 1972
Constituencies established in 1984